Max Fashion is a UAE fashion brand under the banner of the UAE based Landmark Group. That was opened by Micky Jagtiani  The brand was first launched in May 2004, in the Middle East in UAE.

History

Max Fashion was first established in 2004 in the Middle East, in Abu Dhabi. The year 2006 saw the India launch of the brand with its first store in Indore.

Max, at present, is the largest fashion brand in the Middle East, North Africa, South East Asia & India, with over 500 stores encompassing 8.5 million sq.ft., across 20 countries, including United Arab Emirates, India, Saudi Arabia, Kuwait, Jordan, Bahrain, Qatar, Oman, Kenya, Lebanon, Egypt, Algeria, Tunisia, Nigeria, Libya, Tanzania, Indonesia, Malaysia, Iraq and Syria. In 2016, after a decade of its India launch, Max Fashion released its first television commercial.

Catering to the mid-market segment, Max has its own private label clothing for men women and children along with footwear, home and accessories.

Landmark Group 
The Landmark Group, with over US$6 billion revenue, is a retail and hospitality conglomerate in the Middle East, Africa, and the Indian sub-continent. Currently based out of Dubai, the company was established in 1973, with its first store in Bahrain. The group's current employee base stands at 55,000 employees operating over 2,400 outlets, with a retail presence of over 30 million sq. ft. across 21 countries.

Landmark Group has multiple retail brands, including Centrepoint, Babyshop, Splash, Shoe Mart, Lifestyle, Iconic, Max, Shoexpress, Home Centre, Home Box and Emax. The Group also holds franchise rights for many global fashion and footwear brands in the countries where it operates. Since its establishment, the Group has diversified into the segments of leisure, food, hospitality, and healthcare with Landmark leisure, Balance Spa and Salon, Citymax Hotels, Fitness First, and Foodmark, the Group's restaurant division, which operates the Group's own franchise food outlets.

Brand marketing 
Max Fashion is well known for their frequent billboard collections in Dubai and are often referred to as leading innovation in the retail tech industry. In December 2018, Microsoft and Ombori partnered with Max to install interactive bilingual voice activated mirrors in Dubai's Ibn Battuta Mall, bridging the online consumer experience with in-store applications.

Presence in India 
Max, a division of Lifestyle India Pvt. Ltd., opened its 1st store in Indore in the year 2006. In India, Max has more than 200 stores across 80 cities. Max is a mono brand with its own label merchandise that is created by in-house designers for every season, and is currently growing at a 35% CAGR year on year.

References

Retail companies of India
Indian companies established in 2004
Clothing companies established in 2004
Retail companies established in 2004
Clothing brands of India
2004 establishments in India